Amalia Carneri (also Amalie) is the artist name of Amalie Malka Pollak, born Malka Kanarvogel, (September 12, 1875  – 1942 or later during the Holocaust), a  soprano opera and operetta performer based in Vienna, Austria. She performed in several of  Vienna's most prestigious concert venues and made several recordings.

Life

She was born Malka Kanarvogel in Rzeszow, Austro-Hungarian Empire, on September 12, 1875.  She studied music performance at the Vienna Conservatory, and changed her name to a more operatic-sounding "Amalia Carneri".  In her private life she used the name Amalie.

She married government mine inspector Heinrich (Henryk) Pollak (b. June 7, 1877 in Krakow, d. October 7, 1938) in Vienna at the Seitenstettengasse synagogue.  Together they had two sons.  Fritz (Fred), who became a design engineer, was born on February 28, 1909, and Karl (Charles), who became an engineering professor for the University of Rhode Island, was born on January 15, 1920, both in Vienna.

Carneri had an international singing career which included tours of Austria, France, Germany, and Hungary.  The locations of her performances included the Deutsches Theater in Plzeň, the Eden Theater in Strasbourg, and the Stadttheater, Landestheater, Carl-Theater, and the Volkstheater in Vienna. Between 1905 and 1907 she made several phonograph recordings for Edison Records, Odeon Records and Zonophone Records. Her initial mention in the Vienna newspaper Neue Freie Presse was very positive, describing a successful recital in 1898 that was met with enthusiasm by the public.

Her last apartment was in Vienna's Untere Donaustraße 33, right at the Danube Canal. She was expelled from Vienna on September 10, 1942, and interned at the Theresienstadt concentration camp. From there, on September 29, 1942, at the age of 68, she was taken by Holocaust train to the Treblinka extermination camp along with 2001 other prisoners, none of whom survived. Her recorded number on this transport was 973.

Selected recordings
1905: "Du Süße, Süße", from Schützenliesl. Amalie Carneri, soprano, Max Rohr, tenor
1907: "D' lustigen Weanaleut'". Amalie Carneri, Rudolf Kronegger, Edison label
1907: Oscar Straus, "Ich bin a Weaner Madl, ich eine Kammerfrau" from Ein Walzertraum. Odéon, Amalie Carneri, soprano, Mizzi Jezel, soprano
1907: Oscar Straus, "Ich hab' einen Mann" from Ein Walzertraum. Amalie Carneri, soprano, Helene Merviola, soprano
1907: "Mei Muatterl war a Weanerin". Amalie Carneri, Ludwig Gruber, Edison label
1907: Oscar Straus, "O du Lieber, o du G'scheiter" from Ein Walzertraum. Amalie Carneri, soprano, Max Rohr, tenor.
1910: Offenbach, "Barcarolle: Schöne Nacht, du Liebesnacht" from Les contes d'Hoffmann. Label: Odéon, Amalie Carneri, soprano, Willy Strehl, tenor

There is also a Zonophone recording of her singing Mendelssohn's "Spring Song" recorded at the Nationaltheater in Lviv.

References 

News clippings

Marienbader Tagblatt, 10 June 1898.
Pilsner Tagblatt, 3 October 1903, 20 January 1905, 3 February 1905, 2 March 1904.
Fremden Blatt, (Vienna), 1 August 1897, 8 November 1899, 17 April 1906.
Deutsches Volksblatt, 9 April 1907.
Westungarischer Grenzbote, 17 July 1898.
Egerer Zeitung, 25 June 1898, 11 March 1905, 1907.
Oftauer Zeitung, 12 January 1899.
Neue Freie Presse, Vienna, 9 February 1898, 11 July 1898, 2 September 1898, 12 December 1903, 14 October 1905.
Saar Zeitung, 9 April 1904.
Das kleine Blatt, 2 July 1932.
Badener Zeitung, 9 December 1931, 10 January 1932.
Orsovaer Wochenblatt, 3 July 1898.
Radio Tag, 1928.

Dated performance programs
Lohengrin composed by Richard Wagner, role of Ortrud, Grosse Festsaal des Ingenieur- und Architekten-Vereines, Vienna, November 3, 1922.

Recordings
Odeon, Barcarole, Hoffmanns Erzählugen with Willi Strehl
Favorite Record, Schlittenarie a Faunitza and Schmuckwalzer from Faust
Ein Walzertraum composed by Felix Dormann and Leopold Jacobson, September 30, 1908. Role of Friederike von Insterburg, Oberhofmeisterin at Carl-Theater.
Der Selige Vinzenz, by Alexander Landesberg, libretto by Leo Stein, February 26, 1907. Role of Irene at Carl-Theater, February 26, 1907.

1875 births
1943 deaths
Austrian sopranos
People from Rzeszów
Polish people who died in Treblinka extermination camp
Edison Records artists
Zonophone Records artists
Theresienstadt Ghetto prisoners
Polish Jews who died in the Holocaust